Adrian Przechewka (born 30 September 1972) is a Polish luger. He competed at the 1992 Winter Olympics and the 1994 Winter Olympics.

References

External links
 

1972 births
Living people
Polish male lugers
Olympic lugers of Poland
Lugers at the 1992 Winter Olympics
Lugers at the 1994 Winter Olympics
Sportspeople from Wrocław